Zawady is a district of the city of Poznań in Poland, located in the northern part of Nowe Miasto.

Neighbourhoods of Poznań